The 2022–23 season is the 51st in the history of FC Groningen and their 22nd consecutive season in the top flight. The club will participate in Eredivisie and KNVB Cup.

Players

Transfers

Pre-season and friendlies

Competitions

Overall record

Eredivisie

League table

Results summary

Results by round

Matches 
The league fixtures were announced on 17 June 2022.

KNVB Cup

References

FC Groningen seasons
Groningen